Gilles Simon was the defending champion, but lost to Kevin Anderson in the semifinals.

Anderson went on to win the title, 7–6(7–4), 6–7(2–7), 7–6(7–5), against Ivo Karlović. Karlovic became the oldest player since Ken Rosewall in 1977 to contest an ATP final. With a combined height of 4.14 meters, this was the tallest final on the ATP tour in the open era.

Seeds
The top four seeds receive a bye into the second round.

Draw

Finals

Top half

Bottom half

Qualifying

Seeds

Qualifiers

Lucky loser

Qualifying draw

First qualifier

Second qualifier

Third qualifier

Fourth qualifier

External links
 Main draw
 Qualifying draw
 Official website

Singles